The 2009 FIFA Club World Cup final was the final match of the 2009 FIFA Club World Cup, a football tournament for the champion clubs from each of FIFA's six continental confederations. The match took place at the Sheikh Zayed Stadium, Abu Dhabi, on 19 December 2009, and pitted Estudiantes of Argentina, the CONMEBOL club champions, against Barcelona of Spain, the UEFA club champions.

Estudiantes forward Mauro Boselli opened the scoring in the 37th minute, but Pedro equalised for Barcelona with one minute left in regulation time. Lionel Messi scored the winning goal in the fifth minute of the second half of extra time, securing Barcelona's record sixth trophy for the 2009 calendar year.

Road to final

Match

Details

Statistics

References

External links
FIFA Club World Cup UAE 2009, FIFA.com
Technical Report and Statistics (PDF), FIFA.com

w
World
Final
w
w
2009
World
Sports competitions in Abu Dhabi
21st century in Abu Dhabi